The 1983 Coalinga earthquake struck at 4:42 p.m. Monday, May 2 of that year, in Coalinga, California.

The shock was felt from the Greater Los Angeles Area north to Susanville in Lassen County, and between the Pacific Coast and western Nevada. More than 5,000 aftershocks were recorded through July 31, of which 894 had a magnitude of 2.5 or larger. It measured 6.2 on the moment magnitude scale and had a maximum Mercalli intensity of VIII (Severe).

Earthquake
The Coalinga quake was caused by an 0.5-meter uplift of an anticline ridge northeast of Coalinga, but surface faulting was not observed.

Damage

The earthquake caused an estimated $10 million in property damage (according to the American Red Cross) and injured 94 people. Damage was most severe in Coalinga, where the eight-block downtown commercial district was almost destroyed. Here, buildings having unreinforced brick walls sustained the heaviest damage. Newer buildings, such as the Bank of America and the Guarantee Savings and Loan, sustained only superficial damage.

A disaster assessment by the American Red Cross listed the following statistics on damage in the area: almost destroyed – 309 single-family houses and 33 apartment buildings; major damage – 558 single-family houses, 94 mobile homes, and 39 apartment buildings; and minor damage – 811 single-family houses, 22 mobile homes, and 70 apartment buildings. Most public buildings, including the City Hall, hospital, schools, fire house, post office, and police station, sustained only minor damage.

Six bridges of 60 in the area sustained measurable structural damage, which consisted of hairline cracks and spalling at the top of the support columns, fracturing and displacement of wing walls and parapets, and settlement of fill.

All public utilities were damaged, but the water system continued to function despite many leaks in its transmission piping. Gas was shut off for several days because of broken piping and leaks, but only temporary interruptions of electric and telephone services were reported. One large section of old concrete sewerage west of the downtown area partly collapsed but continued to function.

In the oil fields near Coalinga, surface facilities such as pumping units, storage tanks, pipelines, and support buildings were all damaged to some degree. Subsurface damage, including collapsed or parted well casing, was observed on fourteen of 1,725 active wells.

Ground effects
Only a few slope failures occurred east of the epicenter because of the absence of steep slopes in that direction.

Aftermath

The California Seismic Safety Commission investigated the temblor, provided funding and expert technical assistance for planning and reconstruction and published a report on the quake. Coalinga recovered 98 percent of its expenses in repairing and rebuilding public buildings at a time when an 85 percent recovery was considered a success.

The Coalinga earthquake suggested to geologists that the state of California was in worse seismological danger than had been thought. The pace of earthquake activity along the Pacific coast was identified as a relevant subject for further study, and the investigation of earthquakes stemming from unknown faults caused concern. California officials said that a predicted great quake would do far more damage than this one and that if it struck in a densely populated area the damage would be incalculable.

See also

List of earthquakes in 1983
List of earthquakes in California
List of earthquakes in the United States

References

Sources

Further reading
 The Coalinga Anticline and the Coalinga Earthquake of 1983 – San Joaquin Valley Geology

External links

1983 earthquakes
1983
Earthquake 1983
History of Fresno County, California
History of the San Joaquin Valley
Buried rupture earthquakes
1983 in California